Sergei Aschwanden (born 22 December 1975) is a Swiss judoka born in Bern.

Achievements

References

External links
 
 

1975 births
Living people
Swiss male judoka
Judoka at the 2000 Summer Olympics
Judoka at the 2004 Summer Olympics
Judoka at the 2008 Summer Olympics
Olympic judoka of Switzerland
Olympic bronze medalists for Switzerland
Olympic medalists in judo
Medalists at the 2008 Summer Olympics
Sportspeople from Bern
20th-century Swiss people
21st-century Swiss people